Muay Boran (lit. "ancient boxing") or originally Toi Muay is an umbrella term for the unarmed martial arts of Thailand prior to the introduction of modern equipment and rules in the 1930s.

Contemporary history 
In the early 20th century, one of King Chulalongkorn's sons died.  He commanded his officers to gather fighters of exceptional skill to perform as part of the funeral ceremonies.  Three fighters in particular stood out and were granted titles of muen as a means to promote the quality of muay, which had been diminishing at the time.  The chosen fighters were from different parts of the country: Daeng Thaiprasoet from the Northeast region became Muen Changat Choengchok; Klueng Tosa-at from the Central region became Muen Muemaenmat; Prong Chamnongthong from the Southern region became Muen Muaymichue.  Each name means and corresponds to a specific style of muay fighting:  Changatchoengchok means "effective style of punching", Muemaenmat means "skillful punches", and Muaymichue translates to "muay with a reputation".
 
From these grew a few different styles of muay: Lopburi, Khorat, and Chaiya, respectively.  Additional varieties came to be later on, but these three styles were originally actualized under the Muay Boran umbrella.    The strength of this style are the use of hands, shins and knees are developed.  The weakness includes having to be in good shape to be efficient.  Muay Chaiya was created by Phor Than Mar, a Chinese monk, who was on a journey and stay at Pum Riang village in the Chaya district.    Phor Than Mar tamed an elephant that was doing damage to farms.  The strength of this style are the techniques can be use against heavier people and can be used if the user is not in great shape.  The weakness of this style are the attacks are not decisive and require counter attacks.

Muay boran was originally developed for self-defense and also taught to the Thai military for use in warfare. Muay Boran originally is a martial art system which has deadly techniques, grappling techniques and ground fighting techniques apart from its stand up techniques.  This differs from modern-day Muay Thai, which consists only of stand up and is only a ring sport.  Matches between practitioners of the art then began to be held. These soon became an integral part of Thai culture with fights being held at festivals and fighters from the different areas of Thailand testing their styles against each other. Fighters began to wrap their hands and forearms in hemp rope which not only protected their fists from injury but also made their strikes more likely to cut an opponent. Muay boran fighters were highly respected and the best were enlisted into the King's royal guard.
During the 1920s-30s King Rama VII modernized the Thai martial arts competitions, introducing referees, boxing gloves, rounds and western boxing rings. Many of the traditional Muay Boran techniques were banned or were not practical with the addition of the new rules, and so muay boran went into decline.

Name 
Muay Thai was originally known simply as "muay".  The addition of "Thai" was to differentiate the style from western boxing in the early 1900s.  Muay "Boran" only recently became a term used to encompass the origins of Thai martial arts due to the historical writings of Khet Siyaphai.  With the increasing popularity of Muay Thai in the last few decades, nationalistic supporters of Muay felt a need to establish a history of the martial art, resulting in a sometimes unfounded account of the background of Muay Thai and Muay Boran.

See also

Krabi–krabong
Lethwei
Muay Thai
Muay Chaiya
Muay Korat
Muay Lopburi
Muay Thasao
Muay
Silat
Musti-yuddha

References

External links

Thai martial arts